"I Heard Her Call My Name" is a song by American rock band the Velvet Underground. It is the fifth track from the band's second album, White Light/White Heat. It is a particularly loud, brash and aggressive song that features a pair of atonal guitar solos performed by Lou Reed and repeated use of high pitched feedback.

In an interview, guitarist Sterling Morrison said, "I quit the group for a couple of days because I thought they chose the wrong mix for 'I Heard Her Call My Name', one of our best songs that was completely ruined in the studio."

Personnel
 Lou Reed – lead vocals, lead guitar
 Sterling Morrison – rhythm guitar, backing vocals
 John Cale – bass guitar, backing vocals
 Maureen Tucker – percussion

References

The Velvet Underground songs
American garage rock songs
1968 songs
Songs written by Lou Reed
Song recordings produced by Tom Wilson (record producer)